The .38 Special, also commonly known as .38 S&W Special (not to be confused with .38 S&W), .38 Smith & Wesson Special, .38 Spl, .38 Spc, (pronounced "thirty-eight special"), or 9x29mmR is a rimmed, centerfire cartridge designed by Smith & Wesson. 

The .38 Special was the standard service cartridge for the majority of United States police departments from the 1920s to the 1990s. It was also a common sidearm cartridge used by United States military personnel in World War I, World War II, the Korean War, and the Vietnam War. In other parts of the world, it is known by its metric designation of 9×29.5mmR or 9.1×29mmR.

Known for its accuracy and manageable recoil, the .38 Special remains one of the most popular revolver cartridges in the world more than a century after its introduction. It is used for recreational target shooting, formal target competition, personal defense, and small-game hunting.

Overview 

The .38 Special was designed and entered production in 1898 as an improvement over the .38 Long Colt which, as a military service cartridge, was found to have inadequate stopping power against the charges of Filipino Muslim warriors during the Philippine–American War. Upon its introduction, the .38 Special was originally loaded with black powder, but the cartridge's popularity caused manufacturers to offer smokeless powder loadings within a year of its introduction.

Despite its name, the caliber of the .38 Special cartridge is actually .357 inches (36 caliber/9.07 mm), with the ".38" referring to the approximate diameter of the loaded brass case. This came about because the original 38-caliber cartridge, the .38 Short Colt, was designed for use in converted .36-caliber cap-and-ball Navy revolvers, which had untapered cylindrical firing chambers of approximately  diameter that required heeled bullets, the exposed portion of which was the same diameter as the cartridge case.

Except for case length, the .38 Special is identical to the .38 Short Colt, .38 Long Colt, and .357 Magnum. This nearly identical nature of the three rounds allows a .38 Special round to be safely fired in revolvers chambered for .357 Magnum. It also allows .38 Short Colt and .38 Long Colt rounds to be safely fired in revolvers chambered for 38 Special. Thus the .38 Special round and revolvers chambered for it have a unique versatility. However, the longer and more powerful .357 Magnum cartridge will usually not chamber and fire in weapons rated specifically for .38 Special (e.g., all versions of the Smith & Wesson Model 10), which are not designed for the greatly increased pressure of the magnum rounds. Both .38 Special and .357 Magnum will chamber in Colt New Army revolvers in 38 Long Colt due to their straight walled chambers, but this should not be done under any circumstances, due to dangerous pressure levels up to three times what the New Army is designed to withstand.

History 
The .38 Special was designed and produced in 1898 to be a higher velocity round, with better penetration properties than the .38 Long Colt that was in Government Service in the Philippines during the Spanish–American War. The .38 Long Colt revolver round would not penetrate the shields of the insurgent Philippine Moro warriors, and the Government contracted with Smith & Wesson for a new revolver round. The .38 Special held a minimum of 21 grains of black powder, 3 grains more than the then-current .38 Long Colt, and muzzle velocity (with a 158 grain bullet) was 100-150 feet per second greater. 

During the late 1920s, in response to demands for a more effective law-enforcement version of the cartridge, a new standard-velocity loading for the .38 Special was developed by Western Cartridge Company.  This .38 Special variant, which incorporated a  round-nosed lead 'Lubaloy' bullet, was named the .38 Super Police. Remington-Peters also introduced a similar loading.  Testing revealed that the longer, heavier  .357-calibre bullet fired at low velocity tended to 'keyhole' or tumble upon impact, providing more shock effect against unprotected personnel. At the same time, authorities in Great Britain, who had decided to adopt the .38 caliber revolver as a replacement for their existing .455 service cartridge, also tested the same  bullet in the smaller .38 S&W cartridge.  This cartridge was called the .38 S&W Super Police or the 38/200.  Britain later adopted the 38/200 as its standard military handgun cartridge.

In 1930, Smith & Wesson introduced a large frame 38 Special revolver with a 5-inch barrel and fixed sights intended for police use, the Smith & Wesson 38/44 Heavy Duty. The following year, a new high-power loading called the 38 Special Hi-Speed with a  metal-tip bullet was developed for these revolvers in response to requests from law enforcement agencies for a handgun bullet that could penetrate auto bodies and body armor. That same year, Colt Firearms announced that their Colt Official Police would also handle 'high-speed' .38 Special loadings. The media attention gathered by the 38/44 and its ammunition eventually led Smith & Wesson to develop a completely new cartridge with a longer case length in 1934, this was the .357 Magnum.

During World War II, some U.S. aircrew (primarily Navy and Marine Corps) were issued .38 Special S&W Victory revolvers as sidearms for use in the event of a forced landing. The new military .38 Special loading propelled its  bullet at a standard  from a  revolver barrel. During the war, many U.S. naval and Marine aircrew were also issued red-tipped 38 Special tracer ammunition using either a  bullet for emergency signaling purposes.

In 1956, the U.S. Air Force adopted the Cartridge, Caliber 38, Ball M41, a military variant of the .38 Special cartridge designed to conform to Hague Convention rules. This ammunition was intended to prolong the life of S&W M12 and Colt Aircrewman revolvers equipped with aluminum cylinders and frames, which were prone to stress fractures when fired with standard 38 Special ammunition. 
By 1961, a slightly revised M41 38 cartridge specification known as the Cartridge, Caliber 38 Ball, Special, M41 had been adopted for U.S. armed forces using 38 Special caliber handguns. The M41 ball cartridge was first used in .38 Special revolvers carried by USAF aircrew and Strategic Air Command security police, and by 1961 was in use by the U.S. Army for security police, dog handlers, and other personnel equipped with 38 Special caliber revolvers. A variant of the standard M41 cartridge with a semi-pointed, unjacketed lead bullet was later adopted for CONUS (Continental United States) police and security personnel. At the same time, .38 Special tracer cartridges were reintroduced by the US Navy, Marines, and Air Force to provide a means of emergency signaling by downed aircrew. Tracer cartridges in .38 Special caliber of different colors were issued, generally as part of a standard aircrew survival vest kit.

A request for more powerful .38 Special ammunition for use by Air Police and security personnel resulted in the Caliber 38 Special, Ball, PGU-12/B High Velocity cartridge. The PGU-12/B High Velocity cartridge differs from M41 Special ammunition in two important respects—the PGU-12/B is a much higher-pressure cartridge, with a bullet deeply set and crimped into the cartridge case.

In response to continued complaints over ineffectiveness of the standard .38 Special 158-grain cartridge in stopping assailants in numerous armed confrontations during the 1950s and 1960s, ammunition manufacturers began to experiment with higher-pressure (18,500 CUP) loadings of the .38 Special cartridge, known as 38 Special +P (+P or +P+ designation indicates that the cartridge is using higher pressures, therefore it is overpressure ammunition). In 1972, the Federal Bureau of Investigation introduced a new .38 Special +P loading that became known as the "FBI Load". The FBI Load combined a more powerful powder charge with a 158-grain unjacketed soft lead semi-wadcutter hollow-point bullet designed to readily expand at typical .38 Special velocities obtained in revolvers commonly used by law enforcement. The FBI Load proved very satisfactory in effectively stopping adversaries in numerous documented shootings using 2- to 4-inch barreled revolvers. The FBI Load was later adopted by the Chicago Police Department and numerous other law enforcement agencies.

Demand for a .38 Special cartridge with even greater performance for law enforcement led to the introduction of the +P+ .38 Special cartridge, first introduced by Federal and Winchester. Originally labeled "For Law Enforcement Only", +P+ ammunition is intended for heavier-duty .38 Special and .357 Magnum revolvers, as the increased pressure levels can result in accelerated wear and significant damage to firearms rated for lower-pressure .38 Special loadings (as with all .38 Special loadings, the .38 Special +P+ can also be fired safely in .357 Magnum revolvers).

Performance 

Due to its black-powder heritage, the .38 Special is a low-pressure cartridge, one of the lowest in common use today at 17,500 psi. By modern standards, the 38 Special fires a medium-sized bullet at rather low speeds. In the case of target loads, a  bullet is propelled to only . The closest comparisons are the 380 ACP, which fires much lighter bullets slightly faster than most .38 Special loads; the 9×19mm Parabellum, which fires a somewhat lighter bullet significantly faster; and the .38 Super, which fires a comparable bullet considerably faster. All of these cartridges are usually found in semi-automatic pistols.

The higher-pressure .38 Special +P loads at 20,000 psi offer about 20% more muzzle energy than standard-pressure loads and places it between the .380 ACP and the 9mm Parabellum; similar to that of the 9×18mm Makarov. A few specialty manufacturers' +P loads for this cartridge can attain even higher energies than that, especially when fired from longer barrels, produce energies in the range of the 9mm Parabellum. These loads are generally not recommended for older revolvers or ones not specifically "+P" rated.

All of the above specifications for 38 loadings, and the .357 Magnum, are applicable when fired from a  barreled revolver. The velocity is reduced when using the more standard  barreled guns. Power (muzzle energy) will, of course, decrease accordingly.

Although only a few US police departments now issue or authorize use of the .38 Special revolver as a standard-duty weapon, the caliber remains popular with some police officers for use in short-barreled revolvers carried when off duty or for undercover-police investigations. It is also widely used in revolvers purchased for civilian home defense or for concealed carry by individuals with a CCW permit.

Terminal performance and expansion 

There are many companies that manufacture 38 Special ammunition.  It can range from light target loads to more powerful defensive ammunition.  Because of the relatively low pressure that the .38 Special cartridge and even its more powerful +P version can be loaded to, most 38 Special bullets do not expand reliably, even when using hollow-point designs, especially if fired from a short-barreled or 'snub-nose' revolver. In 2004, Speer Bullets introduced the Gold Dot jacketed hollow-point .38 Special cartridge in an attempt to solve this very problem.  Another solution is to use an unjacketed soft lead hollow-point bullet as found in the FBI Load. The latter's 158-grain soft lead hollow point is loaded to +P pressures and velocity, which ensures more reliable expansion in unprotected flesh, even when fired in a 2-inch short-barreled revolver.

Handloading 
The .38 Special is particularly popular among handloaders. The cartridge's straight walls, headspacing on the rim, ready availability of previously-fired cases, and ability to be fired in .357 Magnum firearms, all contribute to this popularity. Additionally, the .38 Special's heritage as a black powder cartridge gives it a case size capable of accommodating many types of powders, from slower-burning (e.g., Hodgdon H-110 or Hercules 2400) to fast-burning (e.g., Alliant Bullseye, the traditional smokeless powder for this cartridge). This flexibility in powders translates directly to versatility in muzzle energy that a handloader can achieve. Thus, with proper care, a suitably-strong revolver, and adherence to safe handloading practices, the .38 Special can accommodate ammunition ranging from light-recoiling target loads to +P+ self-defense rounds. The .38 Special, handloaded with premium to regular lead bullets can be loaded safely to equal the now popular 9x19mm Parabellum round. The round is as viable today as a self-defense round as it was back in 1898.

See also 
 List of handgun cartridges
 Smith & Wesson Bodyguard
 Smith & Wesson Model 52
 Table of handgun and rifle cartridges

References

External links 

 The Snubnose Files
 Ballistics By The Inch .38 special results.

Philippine–American War
38 Special
Weapons and ammunition introduced in 1902
Rimmed cartridges
Smith & Wesson cartridges